Akio Arakawa (July 20, 1927 – March 21, 2021) was a Japanese-born American climate scientist. He was an Emeritus Professor in the Department of Atmospheric and Oceanic Sciences at the University of California, Los Angeles.

Early life and achievements
Arakawa was the youngest of three sons. Living through World War II in Japan, he recalled his two older brothers served in the Japanese military without incident, while he was drafted to work as a fireman part-time while finishing high school. He entered the University of Tokyo in 1947, and spent three years majoring in physics. After graduating in 1950, he applied for one of the few jobs available for physics graduates, with the Japan Meteorological Agency. The agency stationed him on a weather ship to gain experience, and after working in that area for a year and a half, he sought another role in the agency, and was able to gain a position in the forecast research division.

In the 1950s, Arakawa developed mathematics that "permitted the use of a coarser grid" to reduce the computational time needed to estimate climate changes from air sampling data. During this time, Arakawa consulted on the early Goddard Institute for Space Studies (GISS) weather model, later taken up and further advanced by meteorologist Dr. James Hansen.

Recognition and later life
In 1977, Arakawa was awarded the Carl-Gustaf Rossby Research Medal, the highest award in the field of atmospheric science, from the American Meteorological Society, for his work on "mathematical models of the atmosphere and in numerical methods of weather prediction". In 2010, he received the Vilhelm Bjerknes Medal from the European Geosciences Union. In 2018, Arakawa predicted a global warming-related temperature rise over the next century of two degrees, which is slightly lower than the three degree rise predicted using Jule Charney's 1981 model, and the four degree rise predicted by Hansen.

References

External links 

 Oral History interview transcript for Akio Arakawa on 17 July 1997, American Institute of Physics, Niels Bohr Library and Archives - Session I
 Oral History interview transcript for Akio Arakawa on 18 July 1997, American Institute of Physics, Niels Bohr Library and Archives - Session II

1927 births
2021 deaths
Carl-Gustaf Rossby Research Medal recipients
University of Tokyo alumni
University of California, Los Angeles faculty
Japanese emigrants to the United States